PulteGroup, Inc. is an American residential home construction company based in Atlanta, Georgia, United States. The company is the 3rd largest home construction company in the United States based on the number of homes closed. In total, the company has built over 775,000 homes.

The company operates in 44 markets in 23 states. In 2021, it ranked 284th on the Fortune 500. The company was founded by Bill Pulte in Michigan, and moved its headquarters to Atlanta, Georgia in 2014. Since 2016, Ryan Marshall has been the President and CEO of the company.

History
In 1950, Bill Pulte, who was 18 years old, began building and selling houses. In 1956, the company was formed and was based in Bloomfield Hills, Michigan. In 1972, the company became a public company via an initial public offering. In 1998, PulteGroup acquired Divosta for an estimated $150 million. The company also acquired Radnor Homes. In 2001, the company acquired Del E. Webb Construction Company, founded by Del Webb, for $1.8 billion. In 2003, the company acquired Sivage-Thomas Homes. In 2009, Pulte Group acquired Centex for $1.3 billion in stock. In August 2014, the company acquired the real estate assets of Dominion Homes for $82 million.

The company changed its name from Pulte Homes, Inc. to PulteGroup, Inc. in March 2010. The company moved its headquarters to Atlanta, Georgia in 2014. In 2016, Ryan Marshall became president and CEO of the company. In April 2019, the company acquired the homebuilding operations of American West Homes for $150 million.

In 2016, the company won at 9th Annual Shorty Awards for real estate, and in 2022, it was named among Fortune Best Companies to Work For.

Criticism

Stucco defects in Florida homes
In 2019, after an investigation by Florida Attorney General Ashley Moody, Pulte agreed to pay $4.7 million in restitution and make repairs to houses it sold in Florida that had cracks in stucco applied to a wood frame, stucco delamination, and improper installation of weep screed.

2009 allegations of systematic construction defects
On March 26, 2009, Building Justice, a project of the International Union of Painters and the Sheet Metal Workers International Association, with support from the AFL-CIO, released the report of a survey of 872 Pulte and Del Webb home owners in Arizona, Nevada, and California in which 63% of respondents reported construction defects in their homes. The report "Poorly Built by Pulte, No Different at Del Webb: Homeowner Dissatisfaction in Arizona, Nevada and California" was published on the project's website.

Assault of picketing workers
In May 2007, during a protest at a Pulte Homes construction site, an employee used a water truck owned by the company to repeatedly assault a group of workers picketing outside a home with a high pressure water hose. On June 20, 2007, a video of the incident was posted on Youtube.

Dismissed lawsuit regarding propping up sale prices
In October 2009, a class action lawsuit was filed by Steve Berman accusing the company of artificially propping up house sales prices and contributing to the United States housing bubble. The lawsuit was dismissed by the court.

References

External links

1950 establishments in Michigan
Construction and civil engineering companies of the United States
Companies based in Atlanta
Companies listed on the New York Stock Exchange
Construction and civil engineering companies established in 1950
Home builders